Paul Eckert (born 9 September 1990) is a German freestyle skier. He competed in the 2018 Winter Olympics.

References

External links
 
 
 
 

1990 births
Living people
German male freestyle skiers
Olympic freestyle skiers of Germany
Freestyle skiers at the 2018 Winter Olympics
21st-century German people